Ootypus globosus  is a species of silken fungus beetle native to Europe.

References

External links
Images representing Ootypus globosus at BOLD

Cryptophagidae
Beetles described in 1838
Taxa named by Joseph Waltl
Beetles of Europe